Paul Soubry, ICD.D, is President and Chief Executive Officer (CEO) of NFI Group Inc.

Soubry has a sales, marketing, business development, and operations background, with experience in business transformation and LEAN manufacturing. Prior to joining New Flyer in 2009, Soubry worked for 24 years with StandardAero (a leading aviation service provider), starting as a Marketing Assistant in 1984 and progressing to President and Chief Executive Officer. 
 
He holds a Bachelor of Commerce (Honours) degree from the University of Manitoba and completed the Executive Development program at the Harvard Business School. He also completed the Canadian Securities Course and is a member of the Institute of Corporate Directors, having graduated from the Directors Education Program at the Rotman School of Management, University of Toronto. 

Soubry was the Chair of the University of Manitoba Front and Centre Capital Campaign that raised over $625 million (the largest philanthropic investment in Manitoba's history), is a Director on the Boards of the Winnipeg Jets / True North Sports & Entertainment and The Wawanesa Mutual Insurance Company, and is an active supporter of United Way Winnipeg.

He speaks regularly on leadership, innovation and technology, and business ,     and frequently speaks with media on behalf of NFI.          Soubry was named to “Canada’s Top 40 Under 40” in 2003, was inducted in the Canadian Manufacturers and Exporters Hall of Fame in 2014, and was named Canada's Top CEO of the Year by National Post in 2016.  In 2018, he was named recipient of the University of Manitoba's Distinguished Alumni Lifetime Achievement Award, which recognizes significant contributions to profession, community, and the University of Manitoba. In 2020, he received the Canadian Council for the Advancement of Education's (CCAE) Friend of Education Award, recognizing outstanding service to post-secondary or independent school education and leadership to advance education in Canada.

References 

People in bus transport
Living people
Year of birth missing (living people)
Canadian businesspeople